Hoplodoris estrelyado is a species of sea slug, a dorid nudibranch, a marine gastropod mollusc in the family Discodorididae''.

Distribution
This species is recorded from the Indo-West Pacific including Western Australia, Vietnam, Philippines, Indonesia and the Marshall Islands.

References

Discodorididae
Gastropods described in 1998